This is a list of firsts in Poland.

Politics and government
 First President: Gabriel Narutowicz (1865–1922): served from 11 December 1922 until he was assassinated by Eligiusz Niewiadomski five days later.
 First Prime Minister: Stanisław Małachowski (1736–1809): 5 October 1807 - 14 December 1807.
 First female Prime minister: Hanna Suchocka. 
 First openly gay member of the Polish  Sejm: Robert Biedroń.
 First openly transgender member of the Polish Sejm: Anna Grodzka
 First member of the Polish Sejm of African origin: John Godson, 2010-2015.
 First openly gay mayor: Robert Biedroń.

Education and academia 
 First university: Jagiellonian University, founded in 1364.

Science and technology
 First railway: Wrocław to Oława (then in German territory) completed on 22 May 1842.
 First airport: aeroplanes flew from Elbląg Airport (then in German territory, and now closed) in 1912.
 First nuclear reactor: The Ewa reactor R1 in the Instytut Badań Jądrowych (Institute of Nuclear Research), started on July 13, 1954.
 First motorway: Warszawa-Katowice, so called "Gierkówka", 1976.
 First line of the Warsaw Metro: Kabaty to Politechinka, opened on April 7, 1995.

Culture
 First official translation of the Bible:  St. Florian's Psalter (Psałterz floriański),  14th cent.
 First theatre: The National Theatre (Teatr Narodowy) in Warsaw, 1765

Other
 First school shooting in Polish history: Wilno school massacre

Poland
Firsts